Canadian Lakes is an unincorporated community in Mecosta County in the U.S. state of Michigan.  The area is mostly within the southwest portion of Morton Township, southwest of Mecosta and east of Stanwood.

For statistical reporting, the U.S. Census Bureau has defined a census-designated place (CDP) with the same name.  As of the 2000 census, the CDP population was 1,922. The area defined by the CDP includes small portions in eastern Austin Township.

Most of the area is served by the Stanwood ZIP code 49346, although "Canadian Lakes, Michigan", is an acceptable name for mail delivery by the post office. Small portions of the area defined by the CDP are served by other postal delivery areas. A small portion in the southern area of the CDP along the Little Muskegon River is served by the Lakeview ZIP code, 48850. A small area in the eastern part of the CDP is served by the Mecosta ZIP code, 49332.

An area by the same name Canadian Lakes, exists in Ballarat, Victoria , Australia

Geography

Demographics

As of the census of 2000, there were 1,922 people, 923 households, and 726 families residing in the community. The racial makeup of the community was 97.81% White, 0.52% African American, 0.21% Native American, 0.21% Asian, 0.21% from other races, and 1.04% from two or more races. Hispanic or Latino of any race were 0.73% of the population.

There were 923 households, out of which 10.7% had children under the age of 18 living with them, 75.2% were married couples living together, 2.3% had a female householder with no husband present, and 21.3% were non-families. 18.7% of all households were made up of individuals, and 11.2% had someone living alone who was 65 years of age or older.  The average household size was 2.08 and the average family size was 2.32.

In the community, the population was spread out, with 10.1% under the age of 18, 2.8% from 18 to 24, 13.0% from 25 to 44, 36.4% from 45 to 64, and 37.8% who were 65 years of age or older.  The median age was 61 years. For every 100 females, there were 97.7 males.  For every 100 females age 18 and over, there were 95.0 males.

The median income for a household in the community was $51,595, and the median income for a family was $56,595. Males had a median income of $45,000 versus $31,842 for females. The per capita income for the community was $30,770.  About 3.1% of families and 5.1% of the population were below the poverty line, including 15.5% of those under age 18 and 1.8% of those age 65 or over.

References

Unincorporated communities in Mecosta County, Michigan
Census-designated places in Michigan
Unincorporated communities in Michigan
Census-designated places in Mecosta County, Michigan